Untold Legends: The Warrior's Code is an action role-playing video game, the sequel to the handheld video game Untold Legends: Brotherhood of the Blade. It was released on March 2006.  While very similar to the original in gameplay, Warrior's Code introduced five new character classes, improved controls, a wider array of multiplayer modes, more character customizations, and shorter load times. The story is set within the same universe as Untold Legends: Brotherhood of the Blade and makes subtle connections by mentioning past characters/events.

Gameplay
The Warrior's Code is a linear dungeon crawling action role-playing game as its predecessor. The player can choose between five different character classes each one providing different styles to play. Combat involves both ranged and melee attacks.

WiFi
The Warrior's Code includes multiplayer functionality utilizing the PSP's built-in WiFi adapter. The game offers a number of PvP gameplay modes as well as a fully-featured co-op game type that allows to team up with another player to complete the game.  Unlike its predecessor Brotherhood of The Blade, The Warrior's Code also offers the player the ability to play online in infrastructure mode.

Development
As a pre-order bonus, the game was shipped with a small action figure of the Guardian class.

Reception

The game received "mixed or average reviews" according to video game review aggregator Metacritic.

References

External links
 Official Untold Legends: The Warrior's Code website

Role-playing video games
Action role-playing video games
PlayStation Portable games
PlayStation Portable-only games
Sony Interactive Entertainment games
Video games developed in the United States
Video games featuring protagonists of selectable gender
Video games scored by Laura Karpman
2006 video games